The Gaelic Football and Hurling Association of South Australia (GFHASA) was established in 1967. It is the ruling body for Gaelic football and Hurling in the Australian state of South Australia. The GFHASA is affiliated to the Australasia GAA.

The GFHASA runs both Men's and Women's Football matches over the summer at St Mary's Park. The competition was previously played over winter, however clashes with other sports deemed it necessary to move to a summer competition to attract more players.

State Representative Teams are sent to the Australasian Championships every year with Men's senior and Minors and Women's Teams competing.

Clubs
 Angry Leprechauns
 Backyarders
 Blacks Boys
 Blue Baggers
 Boagan's Heroes
 Dirty Dozen
 Eastern Gaels
 Éire We Go
 Flinders O'Neills
 Irish Australians
 Irish Australians Cougars
 Irish Australians Rovers
 Mitchell Park
 Na Fianna
 North Eastern Gaels
 Northern Gunners
 Onkaparinga
 Parkies
 POWA
 Red Army
 Red Lions
 Setanta
 Shenanigans
 Shin Boners
 Saint Brendan's GFC
 Steve Irwin All Stars
 Team Hoff
 The Lions
 The Royals
 The Surps
 The Titans
 TTG Units
 UNISA
 Valley Saints
 Western Ireland

See also

References

External links

Sports governing bodies in South Australia
Australasia GAA
Gaelic games governing bodies in Australia
Irish-Australian culture
1967 establishments in Australia
Sports organizations established in 1967